Då som nu för alltid (Swedish for Then as Now Forever) is the twelfth and final studio album by Swedish alternative rock band Kent. The album was released on 20 May 2016 by RCA Records and Sony Music.

Background
In June 2015, Expressen reported that Kent were to record their twelfth studio album in Electric Lady Studios in New York City. Kent posted a picture on their official Facebook page in December 2015 writing, "Thanks for now, Electric Lady Studios".

On 14 March 2016 Kent announced the release of Då som nu för alltid on RCA Records and Sony Music. It is Kent's first album on Sony Music since En plats i solen (2010). "Egoist" was announced as the album's first single, and it was released on the same date. However, on 17 April 2016 Kent announced the track listing which omitted "Egoist". Instead, "Vi är inte längre där" was released as the album's first single on 3 May 2016.

Då som nu för alltid is produced by Kent themselves.

Track listing
All music and lyrics written by Joakim Berg; except "Den sista sången" written by Joakim Berg, Liv Berg, Ava Berg, and Sixten Berg.

Personnel 
Credits adapted from album liner notes.

Joakim Berg – music, lyrics, vocals, backing vocals, keyboard, piano, programming, guitar, recording, mixer (track 1)
Markus Mustonen – drums, percussion, backing vocals, keyboard, piano
Martin Sköld – bass, keyboard, programming
Sami Sirviö – guitar, keyboards, programming, recording
Liv Berg – music (track 11), lyrics (track 11), backing vocals (track 11)
Ava Berg – music (track 11), lyrics (track 11), backing vocals (track 11)
Sixten Berg – music (track 11), lyrics (track 11), synth bass (track 11)
Kent – producer
Stefan Boman – recording, mixer (tracks 2, 4, 9, 11)
Simon Sigfridsson – recording, mixer (track 1)
Gosha Usov – studio assistant

Michael Ilbert – mixer (tracks 1, 3, 5, 6, 7, 10)
Emily Lazar – mastering
Chris Allgood – mastering assistant
Samuel Bergsten – backing vocals (track 11)
Leo Coval – backing vocals (track 11)
Axel Henriksson – backing vocals (track 11)
Sofia Magnusson – backing vocals (track 11)
Anna Ternheim – vocals (track 5)
Naomi Pilgrim – backing vocals (tracks 1, 2, 3, 4)
Carolina Wallin Pérez – backing vocals (tracks 1, 2, 3, 4)

Charts

Weekly charts

Year-end charts

References 

2016 albums
Kent (band) albums
Swedish-language albums
Pop rock albums by Swedish artists